The Vultee A-31 Vengeance was an American dive bomber of World War II, built by Vultee Aircraft. A modified version was designated A-35. The Vengeance was not used operationally by the United States, but was operated as a front-line aircraft by the British Royal Air Force, the Royal Australian Air Force, and the Indian Air Force in Southeast Asia and the Southwest Pacific. The A-31 remained in service with U.S. units until 1945, primarily in a target-tug role.

Design and development

In 1940, Vultee Aircraft started the design of a single engined dive-bomber, the Vultee Model 72 (V-72) to meet the requirements of the French Armée de l'Air. The V-72 was built with private funds and was intended for sale to foreign markets. The V-72 was a low-wing, single-engine monoplane with a closed cockpit and a crew of two. An air-cooled radial Wright Twin Cyclone GR-2600-A5B-5 engine rated at  powered the V-72. It was armed with both fixed forward-firing and flexible-mounted  machine guns in the rear cockpit.

The Vengeance was uniquely designed to dive vertically without lift from the wing pulling the aircraft off target. To this end, it had a 0° angle of incidence on the wing to better align the nose of the aircraft with the target during the dive. This resulted in the aircraft cruising in a nose-up attitude, giving a poor forward view for the pilot, particularly during landing. It had an unusual, "W"-shaped wing planform. This resulted from an error in calculating its centre of gravity. Moving the wing back by "sweeping" the centre section was a simpler fix than re-designing the wing root. This gives the impression of an inverted gull wing when seen from an angle, when in fact the wing has a more conventional dihedral on the outer wing panels.

France placed an order for 300 V-72s, with deliveries intended to start in October 1940. The fall of France in June 1940 stopped these plans, but at the same time the British Purchasing Commission, impressed by the performance of the German Junkers Ju 87, was shopping for a dive bomber for the Royal Air Force, and as it was the only aircraft available, placed an order for 200 V-72s (named Vengeance by Vultee) on 3 July 1940, with orders for a further 100 being placed in December. As Vultee's factory at Downey was already busy building BT-13 Valiant trainers, the aircraft were to be built at the Stinson factory at Nashville, and under license by Northrop at Hawthorne, California.

The first prototype V-72 flew from Vultee's factory at Downey, California, on 30 March 1941. Additional aircraft were ordered for Britain in June 1941 under the Lend-Lease scheme, with those being given the US Army Air Corps designation A-31.

After the U.S. entered the war following the attack on Pearl Harbor, a number of V-72 and A-31 aircraft were repossessed for use by the USAAF. As the USAAF became interested in dive bombing, it decided to order production of an improved version of the Vengeance, designated the A-35, for both its own use and for supply to its allies under Lend-Lease. It was fitted with a more powerful Wright Twin Cyclone R-2600-19 engine and improved armament. As US Army test pilots disliked the poor pilot view resulting from the zero-incidence wing, that was "corrected" in the A-35, giving the plane a better attitude in cruise but lessening its accuracy as a dive bomber.

When production of the Vengeance was completed in 1944, a total of 1,931 aircraft had been made. The majority were produced at the Vultee plant in Nashville, Tennessee.

Indecision about which aircraft type should replace it in production at the Vultee plant led to several "make-work" contracts for Vengeance aircraft to prevent dispersion of the skilled workforce. That resulted in the overproduction of what was considered an obsolete aircraft.

Evaluation

Operational experience with other dive bomber aircraft of the period, such as the Blackburn Skua, Junkers Ju 87 Stuka, Aichi D3A "Val", Douglas Dauntless, Breda Ba.65 and Curtiss SB2C Helldiver, indicated that the Vengeance would be vulnerable to enemy fighters. To be effective, all those aircraft required an environment of local air superiority and fighter escort. Fighter escort and lack of fighter opposition in the theatres in which it served, combined with its vertical dive capability, meant that the Vengeance suffered only light combat losses.

Early experience with the aircraft showed that there were problems with engine cooling. In service, the RAF managed to solve those problems, but Free French aircraft that did not have these problems remedied were grounded, being declared uneconomical and unreliable to operate.

The aircraft was described as being stable in flight and in a dive, with heavy elevator and rudder control, but with light aileron control. Forward visibility was considered poor due to the large radial engine. There were a number of fatal accidents with the Vengeance due to improper dive procedures, as well as a center of gravity problem when the aircraft was flown with the rear cockpit canopy open, but without a rear gunner.

In combat, the type was considered rugged, reliable, stable, and generally well-behaved. Commonwealth forces operated the type from May 1942 to July 1944. Burma tended to be a low priority for Allied air planners, and forces in that theater got what was left over. Aircraft such as the Vickers Wellington and Hawker Hurricane spent their last days in Burma. The Vengeance saw considerable action attacking Japanese supply, communications and troop concentrations in Burma. Its service in that theater has been described as "...very effective."

Peter Smith, author of Jungle Dive Bombers at War, wrote that, "Their pilots had difficulty in getting them off the ground with a full load. At Newton Field they were using the full length of the  runway before becoming airborne. Kittyhawk aircraft could carry the same bomb load and in addition carry out ground-strafing".

In contrast, many crew spoke well of the Vengeance. "I certainly didn't have that experience of the Vultee. I can recall no incidents of pilots having difficulty in taking off with full bomb loads, and the Kittyhawk could not carry the same bomb load even after their undercarriage had been strengthened. I remember the Vultee as a lovely aircraft to fly, an aircraft that was hard to stall and was fully aerobatic. You could do anything in them, rolls, loops, stall turns, and there was enough room in the cockpit to hold a ball. I used to like flying them, although a lot of blokes thought that they were too cumbersome."

Operational history

UK and India

By the time that Britain had received large numbers of Vengeances, its opinion on the usefulness of specialised dive bombers had changed. As the Battle of Britain and operations over North Africa had shown the dive bomber to be vulnerable to fighter attack, the Vengeance was rejected for use over Western Europe or the Mediterranean. It was decided to use the Vengeance in the Burma Theatre to carry out dive-bombing operations in close support of British and Indian troops in the jungles.

The first RAF squadrons (No. 82 and No. 110) received Vengeances in October 1942. The first dive bombing missions against Japanese forces were flown on 19 March 1943. A further two RAF squadrons in Burma received Vengeances, (No. 84 and No. 45), together with two squadrons of the Indian Air Force (IAF) (No. 7 and No. 8).In cases of heavy monsoon clouds, which obstructed the view during the dive, RIAF pilots practiced the unconventional method of shallow bombing, releasing bombs at 800 feet only. Enough hits were landed using this technique, that they were persuaded by commanders to use this technique when conditions were similar.

Vengeances were heavily deployed in support of the second Arakan campaign of 1943/44, and defending against the Japanese attacks on Imphal and Kohima of April–July 1944. Following the successful defeat of the Japanese attack, the RAF and IAF started to phase out the Vengeance in favour of more versatile fighter bombers and twin-engine light bombers, with the last Vengeance operations over Burma being carried out on 16 July 1944.

After Burma service, a detachment from 110 Squadron RAF was sent to Takoradi in West Africa via the Middle East, a number of aircraft breaking down en route. Between September and December 1944, 11 Vultees took part in air-spraying trials against malarial mosquitoes, using under wing spray dispensers.

Although phased out of front line service with the RAF, Britain continued to receive large numbers of Vengeances, with bulk deliveries of Lend Lease aircraft (as opposed to those purchased directly by Britain) having only just started. Many of these surplus aircraft, including most Vengeance Mk IVs, were delivered to the UK and modified as target tugs, being used in that role both by the RAF and the Royal Navy's Fleet Air Arm (FAA). In those roles, all armament was removed from the aircraft.

Australia

Australia placed an order for 400 Vengeances as an emergency measure following the outbreak of war in the Pacific, which was met by a mixture of Lend Lease and diversions from the original British orders. While the first Vengeance was delivered to the Royal Australian Air Force (RAAF) in May 1942, the aircraft did not arrive in substantial numbers until April 1943. The RAAF's first Vengeance squadron, No. 12 Squadron flew its first operational mission against Selaru Island in the Dutch East Indies. Squadrons equipped with the Vengeance included Nos. 12, 21, 23, 24 and 25 Squadrons. Of these, all but 25 Squadron served briefly in the New Guinea campaign. Australian Vengeances flew their last operational sorties on 8 March 1944, as they were considered less efficient than fighter bombers, having a short range and requiring a long runway, and were withdrawn to allow more effective fighter bombers to move into the forward area. The Vengeance squadrons were re-equipped with Consolidated B-24 Liberator heavy bombers.

The view of the Vengeance's limitations is disputed by Peter Smith in Jungle Dive Bombers at War, "The precision and skill of the dive-bombing method...and its clear superiority over most other means of air attack when it came to destroying small and well-hidden targets in difficult country, was proven over and over again in the Asian jungle campaigns. Yet the men who achieved these excellent results, for such economy of effort and comparatively small loss, were but a handful of pilots who have been forgotten in the overwhelming mass of the heavy-and medium bomber fleets that were pounding both Europe and Asia by 1945.

This capacity was exemplified in the raid by RAAF Nos. 21 and 23 Squadrons on Hansay Bay. Smith wrote, "...the jungle-clad hills and islands of forgotten or unknown lands would become the major stage for the ultimate expression of the dive-bombers' skill." While the RAAF still had 58 Vengeances on order in March 1944, this order was cancelled and the aircraft were never delivered. Small numbers of Vengeances remained in service with support and trials units until 1946.

Brazil
Thirty-three V-72s and A-35s were supplied to Brazil from 1943, carrying out a few anti-submarine patrols. They were withdrawn by April 1948.

Free French
The Free French Air Force received 67 A-35As and -Bs in 1943, being used to equip three bomb groups in North Africa. The French, however, keen to get the aircraft operational as soon as possible did not incorporate improvements found necessary by Britain and Australia, so their aircraft proved to be unreliable and had extremely high oil consumption. As such, they were restricted to training operations, being finally withdrawn in September 1944.

United States

While the U.S. received 243 V-72s and A31s diverted from the RAF orders together with large numbers of A-35s specifically built for it, these saw no combat, being used as initial equipment for light bomber squadrons that re-equipped with twin-engine aircraft before deploying overseas, and as trainers or target tugs.

According to other sources the A-31 saw extensive front-line combat with the 10th Air Force located in China throughout the spring of 1944. As many as 60 A-31's could be fielded for a single mission. The A-31 first saw combat in China on March 14, 1944, when 41 A-31's along with British aircraft hit targets in Arakan and Chin Hills China. It was last used on May 25, 1944, when 20 A-31's scored bombing hits on the Manipar R bridge at Tonzang.

From April 1944, a number of Vengeance Mk IV series Is were made available to the 8th Air Force and assigned to target-towing flights and Combat Crew Replacement Center stations. All armament was removed and a light cable winch fitted in the rear fuselage for sleeve towing. Some of these aircraft continued to be flown with British national markings and serial numbers. By late June 1944, there were seven A-35Bs at RAF Cluntoe, seven at Greencastle, ten at RAF Sutton Bridge and six at RAF East Wretham. When the CCRCs were dissolved in the autumn, the Vengeances were transferred to combat groups, with most fighter and several bomber groups having one on hand at some time during 1945. A-35Bs did not show a high state of serviceability by this time and were generally considered troublesome to maintain. They were also designated RA-35B (R for Restricted) by this time.

Variants

RAF Variants
Vengeance I
Vultee V-72 license built by Northrop and ordered directly for Britain, powered by  R-2600-A5B engine. 200 built.
Vengeance IA
Northrop built aircraft purchased under Lend-Lease, powered by  R-2600-19 engine, otherwise similar to Vengeance I. USAAF designation A-31-NO. 200 built.
Vengeance II
Vultee built aircraft directly purchased by Britain. Small differences from Vengeance I. 501 built.
Vengeance III
Vultee built Lend-Lease aircraft. Similar to IA. USAAF designation A-31-VN. 200 built.
Vengeance IV
A-35B supplied under Lend-Lease to RAF and RAAF. 458 supplied to RAF and 121 to RAAF.

USAAF Variants
XA-31A
Redesignated prototype Vengeance accepted by USAAF in June 1942. Vultee designation V-88.
XA-31B
XA-31A modified as testbed for 3,000 hp (2,240 kW) Pratt & Whitney XR-4360-1 Wasp Major.
XA-31C
Vengeance III modified as testbed for 2,200 hp (1,640 kW) Wright R-3350-18 Duplex Cyclone engine. One converted.
YA-31C
Vengeance IIIs modified as testbeds for R-3350-17 engines for B-29 Superfortress. Five built.
A-35A
Redesigned version for USAAF and Lend-Lease. 4° wing incidence. Powered by 1,700 hp (1269 kW) R-2600-13 or -8 engine. Four forward-firing .50 in (12.7 mm) caliber M2 Browning machine guns and one in rear cockpit. Vultee designation V-88. 99 aircraft built.
A-35B
Modified aircraft with six forward-firing 0.50 in (12.7 mm) machine guns and additional bomb racks. 831 built.
TBV-1 Georgia
A-35Bs meant to be in service with the U.S. Navy, order cancelled.

Operators

 Royal Australian Air Force
 No. 12 Squadron RAAF
 No. 21 Squadron RAAF
 No. 23 Squadron RAAF
 No. 24 Squadron RAAF
 No. 25 Squadron RAAF
 No. 3 Communication Unit RAAF
 No. 4 Communication Unit RAAF
 No. 5 Communication Unit RAAF
 No. 6 Communication Unit RAAF
 No. 7 Communication Unit RAAF
 No. 9 Communication Unit RAAF

 Brazilian Air Force
 1st Dive-Bombing Squadron
 2nd Dive-Bombing Squadron

 Free French Air Force
 GB 1/32 Bourgogne
 GB 1/17 Picardie
 GB 2/15 Anjou
 British India
 Indian Air Force
 No. 7 Squadron IAF
 No. 8 Squadron IAF
 No.1 Service Flying Training School
 No.22 Anti Aircraft Cooperation Unit
 No.1 Target Towing Flight

 Royal Air Force
 No. 45 Squadron RAF
 No. 82 Squadron RAF
 No. 84 Squadron RAF
 No. 110 Squadron RAF
 No. 288 Squadron RAF
 No. 289 Squadron RAF
 No. 291 Squadron RAF
 No. 567 Squadron RAF
 No. 577 Squadron RAF
 No. 587 Squadron RAF
 No. 595 Squadron RAF
 No. 631 Squadron RAF
 No. 667 Squadron RAF
 No. 679 Squadron RAF
 No. 691 Squadron RAF
 No. 695 Squadron RAF
 Royal Navy – Fleet Air Arm
 721 Naval Air Squadron
 733 Naval Air Squadron
 791 Naval Air Squadron

 U.S. Army Air Force
 55th Bombardment Squadron (Dive)
 56th Bombardment Squadron (Dive)
 57th Bombardment Squadron (Dive)
 88th Bombardment Squadron (Dive)
 309th Bombardment Squadron (Dive)
 311th Bombardment Squadron (Dive)
 312th Bombardment Squadron (Dive)
 623rd Bombardment Squadron (Dive)
 628th Bombardment Squadron (Dive)
 629th Bombardment Squadron (Dive)
 630th Bombardment Squadron (Dive)
 631st Bombardment Squadron (Dive)

Surviving aircraft
One complete Vengeance IA that did not see squadron service, serial number A27-99 (EZ999), is displayed at the Camden Museum of Aviation at Narellan, New South Wales, Australia.

Components of Vengeance IIA A24-247 are held at the Historical Aircraft Restoration Society, Australia, to form the basis of a restoration project.

Specifications (Vengeance I)

See also

References

Notes
  Stinson was by this time owned by Vultee, and the factory was transferred to Vultee.
  RAF aircraft operating over Burma replaced the .30 in (7.62 mm) Browning machine guns in the rear cockpit with British built .303 in (7.7 mm) guns owing to poor reliability of the American built guns on flexible mountings.

Bibliography
 Angelucci, Enzo and Paolo Matricardi. World Aircraft: World War II, Volume II (Sampson Low Guides). Maidenhead, UK: Sampson Low, 1978. .
 
 Donald, David (editor). American Warplanes of World War II. London: Aerospace Publishing, 1995. .
 Freeman, Roger."Part 2, Armament and Equipment". Mighty Eighth War Manual. London: Jane's Publishing, Fourth Impression, 1984. p. 208. .
 Halley, James J. The Squadrons of the Royal Air Force. Tonbridge, Kent, UK: Air Britain (Historians), 1980. .
 Jefford, C.G. RAF Squadrons, A Comprehensive Record of the Movement and Equipment of all RAF Squadrons and their Antecedents since 1912. Shrewsbury, UK: Airlife Publishing, 1998 (second edition 2001). .

 March, Daniel J. (editor). British Warplanes of World War II. London: Aerospace Publishing, 1998. .
 Mondey, David. American Aircraft of World War II. London: Aerospace Publishing Ltd., 1982. .
 Pelletier. Alain J. "Consumptive Vengeance: Vultee A-35s in French Service". Air Enthusiast Number 128. March/April 2007. Stamford, UK: Key Publishing, 2007. . pp. 75–79.
 Shores. Christopher and Smith, Frank. "Diving Vengeance." Air Enthusiast  Number Five, November 1977 – February 1978. Bromley, Kent, UK: Pilot Press, 1977. pp. 29–43.
 Smith, Peter C. Vengeance! The Vultee Vengeance Dive Bomber. Shrewsbury, UK: Airlife Publishing, 1986. .
 Wegg, John. General Dynamic Aircraft and their Predecessors. London:Putnam, 1990. .
 Winchester, Jim. American Military Aircraft. Barnes & Noble Books, 2005. .

External links

 USAF museum A-31
 USAF museum A-35A
 USAF museum A-35B
 www.bharat-rakshak.com: Vultee Vengeance Tales
 AirToAirCombat.Com: Vultee A-35 Vengeance

A-31
1940s United States attack aircraft
World War II ground attack aircraft of the United States
World War II dive bombers of the United States
Aircraft first flown in 1941
Single-engined tractor aircraft
Low-wing aircraft